William Charles Winegard,  (September 17, 1924 – January 31, 2019) was a Canadian educator, engineer, scientist and member of Parliament.

Life and career
Born in Hamilton, Ontario, he served during World War II in the Royal Canadian Navy from 1942 to 1945, becoming the youngest officer in the history of the Canadian Navy.  His father William Winegard was a veteran of both world wars, the first mayor of Caledonia, Ontario and the founder of Winegard Motors (Caledonia). In 1952, William received his doctorate in metallurgical engineering from the University of Toronto and he taught there until 1967. From 1967 to 1975, he was President and Vice-Chancellor of the University of Guelph. In 1980, he was made a Fellow of the American Society for Metals (ASM).

He was elected as a Progressive Conservative Party candidate in the riding of Guelph in the 1984 federal election. He was re-elected in the 1988 election in the riding of Guelph—Wellington. He was the Parliamentary Secretary to the Minister for International Trade from 1988 to 1989, the Minister of State (Science and Technology) from 1989 to 1990, and the Minister for Science from 1990 to 1993.

In 1998, he was made an Officer of the Order of Canada.

He married Elizabeth Latham Jaques (b. Morpeth/Moraviantown, Ontario, raised Six Nations Reserve, Ontario) and they had three children, Bill, Charles and Kathryn.  He resided in Guelph, Ontario and was active in many charitable organizations.

He and several other community activists, formed a group they call the Old Man's Club, and they want the site of the former Guelph Correctional Centre to remain green and are opposed to development on that land. He was also against the Ontario Liberal Government's decision to close the Guelph Pacemaker Clinic, forcing about 2,000 Guelphites, mainly seniors, to go to Kitchener for treatment.

On November 11, 2014, he spoke at the Remembrance Day service in Guelph, in which he criticized the Harper Government for its handling of Canadian Veterans.

In the Spring of 2014, the Upper Grand District School Board had named a new public school in the east end of Guelph after him. William C. Winegard Public School opened in September for the 2015 school year and has since have had Winegard make numerous honourable appearances for various events.

He died on January 31, 2019, at the age of 94.

Electoral record

References

External links

 

1924 births
2019 deaths
Canadian academics in engineering
Canadian military personnel of World War II
Members of the 24th Canadian Ministry
Members of the House of Commons of Canada from Ontario
Members of the King's Privy Council for Canada
Officers of the Order of Canada
Politicians from Hamilton, Ontario
Presidents of the University of Guelph
Progressive Conservative Party of Canada MPs
Royal Canadian Navy officers
University of Toronto alumni